Events from the year 1668 in art.

Events
The Sheldonian Theatre in Oxford is completed, to a design by Sir Christopher Wren with ceiling paintings by Robert Streater.

Works

Viviano Codazzi and Filippo Lauri – The Bernini Arsenal at Civitavecchia
Jan de Bray – The artist and his wife as Ulysses and Penelope
Jean Baptiste Dieussart – lead statues Amor Dei and Amor Patriae, Riddarhuset, Stockholm
Gerard de Lairesse – Allegory of the Five Senses
Charles Le Brun
La Colère
Equestrian portrait of Louis XIV
Adriaen van de Velde – Frozen Canal with Skaters and Hockey Players
Jan Vermeer
The Astronomer
The Art of Painting (probably completed at or by this date)

Births
date unknown
Giovanni Battista Cassana, Italian painter of fruit, flowers, and still-life (died 1738)
Étienne-Jehandier Desrochers, French engraver (died 1741)
Yun Du-seo, Korean painter and scholar of the Joseon period (died 1715)
Jan Griffier II, English painter (died 1750)
Clemente Ruta, Italian painter specializing in landscapes with pen and watercolor (died 1767)
Francesco Maria Schiaffino, Italian sculptor (died 1763)
Alessandro Specchi, Italian architect and engraver (died 1729)
Carlo Antonio Tavella, Italian painter of landscapes (died 1738)
Giuseppe Tonelli, Italian painter of frescoes and quadratura (died 1732)
Theodor van Pee, Dutch painter (died 1746)
Domenico Maria Viani, Italian painter of churches, born in Bologna (died 1711)
Peter Schubart von Ehrenberg, painter and stage designer active in Vienna (d. unknown)
probable – Giacomo Antonio Arland, Italian painter of the Baroque period (died 1743)

Deaths
February 8 – Alessandro Tiarini, Italian Baroque painter of frescoes, façade decorations, and altarpieces (born 1557)
April 21 – Jan Boeckhorst, German-born Flemish Baroque painter (born 1604)
May 19 – Philips Wouwerman, Dutch painter (born 1619)
August 23 – Artus Quellinus the Elder, Flemish sculptor (born 1609)
September – Jan Miense Molenaer, Dutch genre painter (born 1610)
September 4 - Titus van Rijn, son and model of Rembrandt (born 1641)
date unknown
Benito Manuel Agüero, Spanish painter of the Baroque period (born 1624)
Giulio Benso, Genovese painter of the early Baroque (born 1592)
Giovanni Battista Bolognini, Italian painter and engraver of the Baroque (born 1611)
Philips de Marlier, Flemish Baroque painter and copyist (born 1600)
Jan Goedart, Dutch painter famous for his illustrations of insects (born 1620)
Antonio Travi, deaf Italian landscape painter (born 1613)

References 

 
Years of the 17th century in art
1660s in art